Easy Rider is a 1969 road movie.

Easy Rider may also refer to:

Music
 Easy Rider (soundtrack), the soundtrack from the film
 The Easy Riders, an American folk band
 "See See Rider" or "Easy Rider", a traditional blues song
 "Easy Rider", a song by Kyoko Fukada, 1999
 "Easy Rider (Let the Wind Pay the Way)", a song by Iron Butterfly from Metamorphosis, 1970

Other uses
 Easy rider (slang), an American slang expression
 EasyRider, a smartcard used for transportation in England
 Easyriders, a motorcycle magazine
 "Easy Rider" (Full House), a television episode

See also
 Easy Riders, Raging Bulls, a nonfiction book by Peter Biskind
 "Ezy Ryder", a song by Jimi Hendrix